Henry F. Ludorf  (1888–1968) was an American architect who specialized in churches and schools mostly for Polish-American Catholic clients in New England.

Childhood and architectural education
Ludorf was born in Chicago in 1899 and  graduated from the Pratt Institute of Architecture and the Columbia University School of Architecture. He then worked for two years as a partner of C. C. Palmer before establishing his own firm in 1921. His offices were located at 100 Hanson Place in Hartford, Connecticut.

Architectural practice
Although Ludorf was a prolific designer of churches and schools his most memorable building is the 1929 art deco-styled Community Center of the Polish National Home in Hartford. This building was described in the Hartford Courant as "a stately Art Deco cube with a stylish, comfortable and inviting interior" for which Ludorf "became known for Art Deco buildings in other East Coast cities."

Personal life
Ludorf was chairman of the Ella Burr McManus Trust Fund and the Connecticut Commission on the Fine Arts.

Works include
 St. Adalbert Church, Providence, RI
 St. Anne Church, Hartford, CT
 St Louis Church, Hartford, CT (destroyed by fire)
 St. John the Evangelist Church, New Britain, CT (basement only)
 St. John the Evangelist Rectory, New Britain, CT
 Holy Name Church, Stamford, CT
 St. Peter and Paul Church, Wallingford, CT
 St. Benedict Church and Rectory, Stamford, CT
 St. Mary Church, Bridgeport, CT (renovation, church has been replaced)
 St. Stanislaw School, Bristol, CT
 SS Cyril and Methodius School, Hartford, CT
 St. Joseph School, Webster, MA
 St. Mary School, Middletown, CT
 Polish Community Center, Northampton, MA
 Roosevelt School, New Britain, CT
 Embassy Theatre, New Britain, CT
 Polish Orphan Asylum, New Britain, CT
 Swedish Bethany Church, New Britain, CT
 Community Center of the Polish National Home, Hartford, CT
 Bushnell Tower, Hartford, CT (with I.M. Pei)

References

1888 births
20th-century American architects
American ecclesiastical architects
Architects of Roman Catholic churches
Architects from Illinois
Architects from Connecticut
Architects from Hartford, Connecticut
Pratt Institute alumni
Columbia Graduate School of Architecture, Planning and Preservation alumni
1968 deaths